Diana Terry (born 1956) is a former Judge of the Colorado Court of Appeals.

Early life and education

Terry was born 1956 in Fort Monmouth Army Hospital in New Jersey. She received a Bachelor of Arts from Rutgers College and a Juris Doctor from Rutgers University School of Law.

Legal career

She began her legal career as a law clerk for Chancery Division of New Jersey Superior Court Presiding Judge Robert Tarleton. She was in private practice from 1985 to 2006 with the law firms of Sherman & Howard; Moye, Giles, O’Keefe, Vermeire & Gorrell; McElroy, Deutsch & Mulvaney; Law Office of Diana Terry; and White & Steele. Terry's practice focused on complex commercial litigation of intellectual property, computer technology, real estate, and insurance coverage matters.

Appointment to state court of appeals

She was one of nine finalists for a new seat on the Colorado Court of Appeals. She was appointed to the court by Governor Bill Owens on July 5, 2006. She was retained by voters in 2008 and again in 2016. She retired on July 7, 2021.

Other activities
She has been a faculty member of the National Institute for Trial Advocacy since 1995, and is a frequent CLE presenter.

References

External links
Biography on Colorado Judicial Branch website

1956 births
Living people
20th-century American lawyers
21st-century American judges
21st-century American lawyers
Colorado Court of Appeals judges
People from Monmouth County, New Jersey
Rutgers School of Law–Newark alumni
Rutgers University alumni
20th-century American women lawyers
21st-century American women lawyers
21st-century American women judges